Bags & Flutes is an album by American jazz vibraphonist Milt Jackson featuring performances recorded in 1957 and released on the Atlantic label.

Reception
The Allmusic review by Michael G. Nastos stated: "This album is top-notch".

Track listing
All compositions by Milt Jackson, except as indicated
 "Bags' New Groove" - 5:55   
 "Sandy" - 3:56   
 "Midget Rod" - 5:41   
 "I'm Afraid the Masquerade Is Over" (Herb Magidson, Allie Wrubel) - 3:41   
 "Ghana" (Ernie Wilkins) - 5:30   
 "Sweet and Lovely" (Gus Arnheim, Harry Tobias, Jules LeMare) - 4:44   
 "Connie's Blues" - 9:45   
Recorded in New York City on May 21, 1957 (tracks 1 & 7), June 10, 1957 (tracks 3, 4 & 6) and June 17, 1957 (tracks 2 & 5)

Personnel
Milt Jackson – vibes
Bobby Jaspar (tracks 1 & 7), Frank Wess (tracks 2-6) - flute
Tommy Flanagan (tracks 1 & 7), Hank Jones (tracks 2-6) - piano
Kenny Burrell - guitar
Percy Heath - bass
Art Taylor - drums

References 

Atlantic Records albums
Milt Jackson albums
1957 albums
Albums produced by Nesuhi Ertegun